James Stephen Green (February 28, 1817January 19, 1870) was a Democratic United States Representative and Senator from Missouri.

Early life and education
Born near Rectortown in Fauquier County, Virginia, he attended the common schools and moved first to Alabama, and later to Missouri around 1838. He studied law, was admitted to the Bar in 1840, and commenced practice in Monticello, Missouri, and later Canton, Missouri, a short distance away.

Family
His brother, Martin E. Green, became a Confederate brigadier general during the American Civil War.

Political career
Green was a delegate to the State constitutional convention in 1845 and was elected as a Democrat to the 30th and 31st Congresses, serving from March 4, 1847, to March 4, 1851. He was not a candidate for renomination in 1850, and was subsequently Chargé d'Affaires to New Granada in 1853–1854.

He was appointed Minister Resident in June 1854, but did not present his credentials; he was elected to the 35th Congress, but did not take his seat, having been elected to the U.S. Senate to fill a vacancy during the term commencing March 4, 1855, where he served from January 12, 1857, to March 4, 1861. While in the Senate, he was chairman of the Committee on Territories during the 35th and 36th Congresses.

Death
Green died in St. Louis, Missouri on January 19, 1870. He is buried in the Forest Grove Cemetery in Canton. He is the namesake of the community of Greensburg, Missouri.

References

External links

1817 births
1870 deaths
Missouri lawyers
People from Fauquier County, Virginia
People from Monticello, Missouri
Ambassadors of the United States to Colombia
Democratic Party United States senators from Missouri
19th-century American diplomats
Democratic Party members of the United States House of Representatives from Missouri
19th-century American politicians
People from Canton, Missouri
19th-century American lawyers